Aldaia is a municipality in the comarca of Horta Oest in the Valencian Community, Spain.

Local politics
Aldaia is located in l'horta, an area known as the red belt due to its tendency to vote for left wing parties. Until 2011, all elections with the exception of 1995 produced an absolute majority for the Spanish Socialist Workers' Party (PSOE). The People's Party won a majority at the 2011 local elections. A PSOE-led administration was formed after the 2015 elections, and the PSOE regained its absolute majority in 2019.

Summary of council seats won

Source:

*Results for the Communist Party of Spain. In 1986 they joined with other parties to form the current United Left.

#In 1983, the People's Alliance (AP), Democratic Popular Party (PDP), Liberal Union (UL) and Valencian Union (UV) formed a four-party electoral alliance. The electoral alliance ended in 1986 and the AP and UV contested the 1987 local elections separately. In 1989 the AP merged with the PDP and UL to form the current People's Party.

Notable people
Voltor — ska/rock band

References

Municipalities in the Province of Valencia
Horta Sud